Estación Linares is a railway station of the Empresa de los Ferrocarriles del Estado, located in Linares, Chile . It is the main railway station in the Linares Province, and is located on Brasil Avenue.

Estación Linares is part of the Red Sur EFE, the TerraSur inter-city service has a stop here, and since 2012 the Expreso Maule has its final stop here.

The Ramal Colbún diverged from here, to the commune of Colbún, but the line was completely closed.

The nearby Linares Bus Terminal is within walking distance from the Station.

Lines and trains 
The following lines and trains pass through or terminate at Estación Linares:

Red Sur EFE
TerraSur inter-city service (Alameda - Chillán)
Expreso Maule inter-city service (Alameda - Linares)

Adjacent stations

External links 
 Empresa de los Ferrocarriles del Estado
 TerraSur

Linares
Buildings and structures in Maule Region
Transport in Maule Region